Stara Zagora Coat of Arms was created in  1979 for the 100-th anniversary of the rebuild of Stara Zagora, when the municipality made a decision to create a new Coat of Arms. The task of composing the new Coat of Arms was given to artist Hristo Tanev.

Composition
The symbolic meaning of the shield is - to protect, defend, provide sanctuary and it is the foundation of the seal.  In its upper part the shield ends in a castle wall, which emphasizes the important administrative, military, political and economical importance
of Stara Zagora for the hundreds of years of its growth and development.

In its central part on a red background, there is a mother and baby lion.  This particular picture has been taken from a rock carving from the 12th century found in Stara Zagora in 1949 and has become one of the city symbols.  The lioness represents the mother instinct, fertility and is placed in the central part of the Coat of Arms, which has not only historical, but symbolic meaning, to show that despite what the city has been through in the past thousands of year it still continues its existence and continues its progress.

The bottom has green background with golden-yellow stripes which converge towards the center.  This enhances the fertility of the Stara Zagora fields and is a symbol of roads to the future.
The green color is a symbol of life and death and the hope and happiness.  The red color, used for the central part, is a symbol of fire, health, strength and love.  The gold-yellow is a sign of light, intellect, belief and good.

Stara Zagora
Coat of arms
Stara Zagora